Cedar Rock State Park is a state park of Iowa, USA, preserving the Frank Lloyd Wright-designed Lowell Walter Residence, also known as Cedar Rock.  The Usonian- style house was constructed on a bank of the Wapsipinicon River near Quasqueton, Iowa, in 1950. Following Lowell Walter's death in 1981, the home was donated to the Iowa Department of Natural Resources and opened to the public.

The Walter House at Cedar Rock is one of Frank Lloyd Wright's most complete signature designs. Nearly everything at Cedar Rock bears the architect's imprint. Wright designed the furniture, chose the draperies, and even picked out the accessories.

Background

Cedar Rock is an important example of the Midwestern residential style created by Wright, characterized by its provisions for living simply and in harmony with nature. The Walter Residence is an example of a simplified style Wright called “Usonian". These designs were typically created as a single story with zoned areas for living. Wright accomplished this by designing this home in a "tadpole" shape.

References

 Storrer, William Allin. The Frank Lloyd Wright Companion. University Of Chicago Press, 2006,  (S.284)

External links
 Friends of Cedar Rock
 Cedar Rock State Park
SAH Archipedia Building Entry

Frank Lloyd Wright buildings
Historic house museums in Iowa
Houses in Buchanan County, Iowa
National Register of Historic Places in Buchanan County, Iowa
Houses on the National Register of Historic Places in Iowa
Museums in Buchanan County, Iowa
Protected areas established in 1981
State parks of Iowa